"For You" is a song co-written and recorded by Australian country music singer Keith Urban. It is included on Act of Valor: The Album, and plays over the closing credits to the film Act of Valor. It was released as a single in April 2012.  The song was nominated at the 70th Golden Globe Awards for Best Original Song.

History
The song is about the sacrifices made by soldiers. The single was certified Gold in the USA in early February 2013. Urban said in a statement (reported by The Boot) that he and Monty Powell were inspired to write the song after seeing Act of Valor, and that he "wanted to capture the essence of not only what these men and women do so extraordinarily, but how that relates to all of us."  All proceeds from the single are donated to the Navy SEAL Foundation.

Critical reception
In his review of the album, Billy Dukes of Taste of Country wrote that the song "sets the tone and is especially powerful."

Kevin John Coyne of Country Universe gave the song a B−, saying that Urban's voice was "typically sincere", although he called the production "overblown" and criticized the lyrics by saying "the opening reference to his wife and unborn child feel tacked on."

The song was nominated both at the 70th Golden Globe Awards and at the 18th Critics' Choice Awards in the respective Best Original Song categories.

Music video
The video features Urban singing the song in a desert with a full band, and some shots of just him and a guitar playing. Scott Waugh, who co-directed "Act of Valor" directed the video, which also shows scenes from the movie and real bombs and explosives going off at the beginning of each chorus. It was filmed in CA's Mojave Desert, where much of the movie was also filmed.

Chart performance

Year-end charts

Certifications

References

2012 singles
2012 songs
Keith Urban songs
Songs written by Keith Urban
Songs written by Monty Powell
Song recordings produced by Dann Huff
Capitol Records Nashville singles